The 2021–22 Robert Morris Colonials men's basketball team represented Robert Morris University in the 2021–22 NCAA Division I men's basketball season. The Colonials, led by 12th-year head coach Andrew Toole, played their home games at the UPMC Events Center in Moon Township, Pennsylvania as members of the Horizon League.

Previous season
The Colonials finished the 2020–21 season 4–15, 3–12 in Horizon League play to finish in last place. In the Horizon League tournament, they lost to Detroit Mercy in the first round.

Roster

Schedule and results

|-
!colspan=12 style=| Regular season

|-
!colspan=9 style=| Horizon League tournament

Sources

References

Robert Morris Colonials men's basketball seasons
Robert Morris
Robert Morris Colonials men's basketball team
Robert Morris Colonials men's basketball team